David Craig (born 8 June 1944) is a Northern Irish retired footballer. His position was right-back.

He joined Newcastle United in 1966 and went on to make 460 appearances for the club, scoring seven goals. He left the club in 1978 after retiring from the game, and remains seventh-highest appearance-maker for the club. David now resides in the Northumbrian village of Rothbury & runs the local Cricket Club, the kidney breathers. Craig was part of the Newcastle team that won the Inter-Cities Fairs Cup in 1969.

References

External links
Post War English & Scottish Football League A–Z Player's Transfer Database profile

1944 births
Living people
Association footballers from Belfast
Association footballers from Northern Ireland
Newcastle United F.C. players
Shamrock Rovers F.C. guest players
Northern Ireland international footballers
Blyth Spartans A.F.C. players
English Football League players
Association football fullbacks